Galio is a town in Grand Gedeh County in Liberia, near the border of Ivory Coast.

References

Grand Gedeh County